Kim Berkeley Clark is an American attorney and judge. She currently serves as the President Judge of the Fifth Judicial District Court of Pennsylvania. She was first appointed as a judge in 1999.

Clark made national headlines in February 2020 when a judge under her supervision used a racial epithet to describe an African-American juror who served on a jury that acquitted a drug dealer, according to NBC News. Clark removed the judge from the bench.

She was appointed by Pennsylvania Governor Tom Ridge in 1999, elected to a full ten-year term that same year and reelected to ten-year terms in 2009 and 2019. Prior to her appointment in 1999, Clark served as Assistant and Deputy District Attorney in Allegheny County, Pennsylvania.

References 

Living people
People from Allegheny County, Pennsylvania
Year of birth missing (living people)
Place of birth missing (living people)
County judges in the United States
21st-century American judges
20th-century American judges
20th-century American women judges
21st-century American women judges